SHGC can mean:

 Sacred Heart Girls' College, Hamilton
 Sacred Heart Girls' College, New Plymouth
 Solar Heat Gain Coefficient